Yakima County is a county in the U.S. state of Washington. As of the 2020 census, its population was 256,728. The county seat and largest city is Yakima. The county was formed out of Ferguson County in January 1865 and is named for the Yakama tribe of Native Americans.

Yakima County comprises the Yakima, WA Metropolitan Statistical Area and is Washington state's largest majority-Hispanic county as of 2020.

History
The area that now comprises Yakima County was part of the Oregon Country at the start of the nineteenth century, inhabited both by fur prospectors from Canada, and Americans seeking land for agricultural and mineral-extraction opportunities. Unable to resolve which country should control this vast area, the Treaty of 1818 provided for joint control. By 1843, the Provisional Government of Oregon had been established, although at first there were questions as to its authority and extent. During its existence, that provisional government formed the area north of the Columbia River first into the Washington Territory, and then (December 19, 1845) into two vast counties: Clark and Lewis.

The Washington Territory was formed as a separate governing entity in 1853. In 1854, that legislature carved several counties out of the two original large counties, including Skamania County. Later in 1854 the new Skamania County was reduced in size by carving out Walla Walla County. This arrangement lasted until January 23, 1863, when Ferguson County was carved out of Walla Walla County. However, the Ferguson County government and boundary was dissolved on January 18, 1865, and its area was assigned to Yakima County three days later.

Since its creation, the Yakima County boundary has been altered two times. In 1883 a portion of its area was carved off in the creation of Kittitas County, and in 1905 a further reduction added to the creation of Benton County.

The Yakama Indian Reservation was created in 1855. However, several tribes felt the agreement creating this reserved area had been completed without sufficient native input, and skirmishes and local war (the Yakima War, which lasted until 1858) meant that the reservation was not fully operational for two decades. The Reservation is the 15th largest reservation in America, covering 1,573 mi2 (4,074 km2), and comprising 36% of the county's total area. Its population was 31,799 in 2000, and its largest city is Toppenish.

Geography

Yakima County is the second-largest county in Washington by land area and third-largest by total area. Yakima County is reputed to be one of the most difficult places on earth to predict weather, because of its surrounding mountains. The county's area is larger than the states of Delaware and Rhode Island combined. The highest point in the county is Mount Adams, which is the second tallest peak in Washington and the third tallest in the Cascade Range.

Geographic features

Mount Adams, 
Gilbert Peak, 
Mount Aix, 
Tieton Peak, 
Cascade Mountains
Rattlesnake Hills
Horse Heaven Hills

Major rivers
Yakima River
Columbia River
Naches River
Tieton River
Bumping River
American River

National protected areas

Wenatchee National Forest (part)
Gifford Pinchot National Forest (part)
Snoqualmie National Forest (part)
Goat Rocks Wilderness
Mount Adams Wilderness (part)
Norse Peak Wilderness (part)
William O. Douglas Wilderness
Toppenish National Wildlife Refuge

Major roads
 Interstate 82
 U.S. Route 12
 U.S. Route 97

Adjacent counties
Pierce County - northwest
Lewis County - west
Skamania County - southwest
Kittitas County - north
Klickitat County - south
Grant County - northeast
Benton County - east

Demographics

2000 census
As of the census of 2000, there were 222,581 people, 73,993 households, and 54,606 families living in the county. The population density was 52 people per square mile (20/km2). There were 79,174 housing units at an average density of 18 per square mile (7/km2). The racial makeup of the county was 65.60% White, 0.97% Black or African American, 4.48% Native American, 0.95% Asian, 0.09% Pacific Islander, 24.43% from other races, and 3.48% from two or more races. 35.90% of the population were Hispanic or Latino of any race. 13.2% were of German, 6.4% United States or American, 5.9% English and 5.4% Irish ancestry.

There were 73,993 households, out of which 39.7% had children under the age of 18 living with them, 55.8% were married couples living together, 12.5% had a female householder with no husband present, and 26.2% were non-families. 21.5% of all households were made up of individuals, and 9.6% had someone living alone who was 65 years of age or older. The average household size was 2.96 and the average family size was 3.44.

In the county, the population was spread out, with 31.8% under the age of 18, 9.8% from 18 to 24, 27.5% from 25 to 44, 19.7% from 45 to 64, and 11.2% who were 65 years of age or older.  The median age was 31 years. For every 100 females there were 99.6 males. For every 100 females age 18 and over, there were 97.1 males.

The median income for a household in the county was $34,828, and the median income for a family was $39,746. Males had a median income of $31,620 versus $24,541 for females. The per capita income for the county was $15,606. About 14.8% of families and 19.7% of the population were below the poverty line, including 27.2% of those under age 18 and 11.3% of those age 65 or over.

2010 census
As of the 2010 census, there were 243,231 people, 80,592 households, and 58,790 families living in the county. The racial makeup of the county was 63.7% white, 4.3% American Indian, 1.1% Asian, 1.0% black or African American, 0.1% Pacific islander, 26.1% from other races, and 3.7% from two or more races. Those of Hispanic or Latino origin made up 45.0% of the population. In terms of ancestry, 15.8% were German, 8.0% were English, 7.3% were Irish, and 3.6% were American.

Of the 80,592 households, 42.1% had children under the age of 18 living with them, 51.4% were married couples living together, 14.7% had a female householder with no husband present, 27.1% were non-families, and 21.6% of all households were made up of individuals. The average household size was 2.97 and the average family size was 3.46. The median age was 32.2 years.

The median income for a household in the county was $42,877 and the median income for a family was $48,004. Males had a median income of $37,029 versus $29,824 for females. The per capita income for the county was $19,325. About 16.8% of families and 21.8% of the population were below the poverty line, including 31.9% of those under age 18 and 11.9% of those age 65 or over.

Economy 
At the last census, the county harvested  of potato (Solanum tuberosum).

Wine regions 
Washington ranks second in the United States in the production of wine, behind only California. The Yakima Valley AVA was established in 1983 in the state's oldest agricultural region. It is Washington's third largest officially designated American Viticultural Area (AVA), and is responsible for more than 40% of the state's wine production.

Located within the larger Columbia Valley AVA, the Yakima Valley AVA is sub-divided into the three smaller wine regions, each with distinctive growing conditions. They are Red Mountain AVA, Snipes Mountain AVA, and Rattlesnake Hills AVA.

Pests 
Common agricultural pests here include the Green Peach Aphid (Myzus persicae), the Spotted Cutworm (Xestia c-nigrum), and the Beet Leafhopper (Circulifer tenellus) in potato.

Communities

Cities

 Grandview
 Granger
 Mabton
 Moxee
 Selah
 Sunnyside
 Tieton
 Toppenish
 Union Gap
 Wapato
 Yakima (county seat)
 Zillah

Towns

Harrah
Naches

Census-designated places

Ahtanum
Buena
Cowiche
Donald
Eschbach
Gleed
Outlook
Parker
Satus
Summitview
Tampico
Terrace Heights
West Valley
White Swan

Unincorporated communities

Artesian
Ashue
Belma
Birchfield
Blackrock
Brownstown
Buena
Byron
Cliffdell
East Selah
Emerald
Empire
Farron
Flint
Fort Simcoe
Fruitvale
Givens Corner
Goose Prairie
Gromore
Harwood
Holtzinger
Jonathan
Liberty
Lichty
Midvale
Nass
Nile
Pinecliff
Plainview
Pomona
Rimrock
Sawyer
Spitzenberg
Venner
Waneta
Weikel
Wenas
Wiley City
Yethonat

Politics
Yakima County leans Republican in statewide elections. On only four occasions has it backed a Democrat for President – it has voted for the same candidate as the state of South Dakota in every election since they first voted for President – and the last Democratic gubernatorial candidate it backed was Albert D. Rosellini in 1956.

Only Adams County and Columbia County, which last backed a Democrat for governor in 1936 when Clarence D. Martin swept every county in the state, have consistently backed Republicans for governor for longer. Although Yakima County did narrowly support Maria Cantwell in 2012, the previous statewide candidate to carry Yakima County for the Democrats was popular Senator "Scoop" Jackson in 1982.

See also
National Register of Historic Places listings in Yakima County, Washington

References

Further reading
 William Denison Lyman, History of the Yakima Valley, Washington: Comprising Yakima, Kittitas, and Benton Counties. In Two Volumes. Chicago: S.J. Clarke Publishing Co., 1919. Volume 1 and Volume 2.

External links

Yakima County, official county site
Yakima Valley Visitors Bureau
Washington Wine Commission

 
1865 establishments in Washington Territory
Populated places established in 1865
Eastern Washington
Washington placenames of Native American origin